Claude Simons may refer to:

Claude Simons Jr. (1914–1975), Tulane University football and basketball coach
Claude Simons Sr. (1887–1943), Tulane University basketball, baseball, and track coach, and football trainer